The Wildhorse Ladies Golf Classic is a tournament on the Epson Tour, the LPGA's developmental tour. It has been a part of the tour's schedule since 2022. 

The tournament is held at the Wildhorse Resort & Casino in Pendleton, Oregon. 

Daniela Iacobelli won the inaugural event for her fourth Epson Tour title.

Winners

References

External links
Coverage on Epson Tour website

Symetra Tour events
Golf in Oregon
Recurring sporting events established in 2022
2022 establishments in Oregon